Moustafa Abdel Naser (born 4 April 1975) is a Libyan sprinter. He competed in the men's 400 metres at the 1996 Summer Olympics.

References

1975 births
Living people
Athletes (track and field) at the 1996 Summer Olympics
Libyan male sprinters
Olympic athletes of Libya
Place of birth missing (living people)